Melissa R. Wells (born October 3, 1983) is an American politician and a Democratic member of the Maryland House of Delegates, currently representing 40th Legislative District, based in west Baltimore City.

Early life and career
Wells was born on October 3, 1983. She attended University of California at Riverside in 2006, where she earned a B.A. degree in political science and law and sociology. She later attended American University in 2010, where she earned a M.A. degree in public policy. After graduating, she worked as a policy assistant for the Joint Center for Political and Economic Studies until 2014 and as a field advisor at Triple Point Interactions and program associate at PolicyLink until 2015. She is currently the regional director of the Baltimore-DC Building Trades Union.

In the legislature
Wells was sworn into the Maryland House of Delegates on January 9, 2019. She was an unsuccessful candidate for assistant majority leader of the House of Delegates, losing to state delegate Wanika B. Fisher in a 25-13 vote among the class of freshman Democratic legislators. Since 2020, she has served as Deputy Majority Whip.

Committee assignments
 Environment and Transportation Committee, 2019–present (housing & real property subcommittee, 2019–present; land use & ethics subcommittee, 2019–present; natural resources, agriculture & open space subcommittee, 2020–present)

Other memberships
 1st Vice-Chair, Legislative Black Caucus of Maryland, 2020–present (member, 2019–present)
 Maryland Legislative Latino Caucus, 2021–present
 Women Legislators of Maryland, 2019–present
 2nd Vice-Chair, Baltimore City Delegation, 2020–present
 Maryland Legislative Transit Caucus, 2019–present

Electoral history

References
 

21st-century American politicians
Democratic Party members of the Maryland House of Delegates
Living people
21st-century American women politicians
Women state legislators in Maryland
African-American state legislators in Maryland
African-American women in politics
1983 births
21st-century African-American women
21st-century African-American politicians
20th-century African-American people
20th-century African-American women